Dabney is an unincorporated community in Otter Creek Township, Ripley County, in the U.S. state of Indiana.

History
Dabney was originally called Poston, and under the latter name was laid out in 1855.

A post office was established under the name Poston in 1856, was renamed to Dabney in 1897, and remained in operation until it was discontinued in 1934.

Geography

References

Unincorporated communities in Ripley County, Indiana
Unincorporated communities in Indiana